Juan José Ayra Martínez (23 June 1911 – 26 October 2008) was a Cuban International Footballer. He played as goalkeeper

He represented Cuba at the 1938 FIFA World Cup in France. He appeared in one game, versus Romania, in a 2-1 victory.

References

External links
 

1911 births
2008 deaths
Sportspeople from Guantánamo
Association football goalkeepers
Cuban footballers
Cuban expatriate footballers
Cuba international footballers
1938 FIFA World Cup players
Expatriate footballers in Mexico
Liga MX players
Real Club España footballers
Cuban expatriate sportspeople in Mexico